Valerio Lualdi (born 31 August 1951) is an Italian former professional racing cyclist. He rode in four editions of the Tour de France and four editions of the Giro d'Italia.

References

External links
 

1951 births
Living people
Italian male cyclists
People from Busto Arsizio
Cyclists from the Province of Varese